The Mount Pleasant Mail Centre (often shortened as Mount Pleasant, known internally as the Mount and officially known as the London Central Mail Centre) is a mail centre operated by Royal Mail in London, England. The site has previously operated as one of the largest sorting offices in the world. It is located in the London Borough of Islington, on the boundary with the London Borough of Camden.

History
The street called Mount Pleasant gained its name ironically in the 1730s after locals had begun to dump cinders and other refuse.

The centre was officially opened on 30 August 1889 when the Post Office (Sites) Act (52 & 53 Vict. Ch. ccix) was passed by Parliament. It was built on the location of the former Coldbath Fields Prison that ceased to function in 1885. The original prison gate was incorporated into the Post Office building and not demolished until 1901. 

The remaining sections of the prison were demolished in 1929, when the new wing was built as an extension to the Letter Office. The Post Office (Sites) Act 1889 required the Post Office to provide a portion of the site, or £10,000, to London County Council for use as open space. The Post Office chose to retain the entire site, and provided the funds, which were used to purchase Spa Green Gardens in Clerkenwell.

From 1927 to 2003, Mount Pleasant was connected to other major Royal Mail offices and railways stations in London, via the London Post Office Railway. In 1979, it pioneered the use of optical character recognition for sorting purposes with the installation of a machine.

Location

It is located on a twelve-acre site in the Mount Pleasant area of Clerkenwell, at the junction between Farringdon Road and Rosebery Avenue and opposite Exmouth Market. Mount Pleasant hosts the British Postal Museum & Archive, located in Freeling House on the back of the sorting office. A Post Office branch forms part of the site, fronting on to Rosebery Avenue.

It is proposed by Royal Mail that half the site will be used for residential and commercial redevelopment. The remaining operational part of the site is being modernised.

Postal administration
The site is the mail centre of the EC postcode area, the N postcode area, the W1 postcode district and the WC postcode area.

References

External links

 Mount Pleasant, an exhibition curated by the British Postal Museum & Archive

Royal Mail
Buildings and structures in the London Borough of Islington
Government buildings completed in 1889
Infrastructure in London
Post office buildings in the United Kingdom
Sorting offices